Botanichesky Sad:

Moscow Metro
 Botanichesky Sad (Kaluzhsko-Rizhskaya Line) is a station of the Kaluzhsko-Rizhskaya Line of the Moscow Metro.
 Botanichesky Sad (Moscow Central Circle)
 Botanichesky Sad, name of the Prospekt Mira station of the Koltsevaya Line of Moscow Metro between 1952 and 1966
 Botanichesky Sad, name of the Prospekt Mira station of the Kaluzhsko-Rizhskaya Line of Moscow Metro between 1958 and 1966

Other metro
 Botanichesky Sad (Novosibirsk Metro)
 Botanichesky Sad (Kharkiv Metro)

Other
 Botanichesky Sad (film) by Vladimir Gostyukhin

See also 
 Botanical garden, Botanichesky Sad means Botanical Garden in the Russian language